Fire support is a military term used to describe weapons fire used to support friendly forces by engaging, suppressing, or destroying enemy forces, facilities, or materiel in combat. It is often provided through indirect fire, though the term may also be used for some forms of supporting direct fire.

The United States Department of Defense defines fire support as "fires that directly support land, maritime, amphibious, and special operations forces to engage enemy forces, combat formations, and facilities in pursuit of tactical and operational objectives."

Overview 

Fire support generally consists of fire from heavy or crew-served weaponry with high firepower, including strikes and barrages from artillery, mortars, rocket artillery, and missiles; naval gunfire support from naval artillery; airstrikes, strafes, and close air support from military aircraft; and drone strikes from unmanned combat aerial vehicles; among various other forms. Fire support is typically ordered and directed by an observer (e.g. artillery observer, forward air controller, etc.) on the front line, and provided by a weapon crew or operator in the rear, usually from a fortification, vehicle, or facility (such as a fire support base).

Fire support is used to support and supplement military units that may lack the capabilities or firepower offered by fire support. For example, an infantry unit needing heavy explosives to bombard an enemy emplacement, or a large smoke screen to cover their advance, and lacking the ability to do so themselves (e.g. insufficient effectiveness using grenades), may call for fire support from a capable nearby mortar unit.

Fire support can reduce friendly casualties whilst devastating enemy capabilities and morale. Effective use of fire support—as seen during the 2018 Battle of Khasham of the Syrian Civil War, where an outnumbered force used various forms of fire support to their advantage, avoiding serious casualties—may help swing a battle in one's favor.

History 

Varying forms of fire support have existed since the advent of early cannons and rockets, which were used to bombard enemy positions and fortifications to support infantry. Warships have long provided fire support using their cannons. The use of fire support in its current form developed during World War I and World War II, when combined arms and advances in technology and tactics made fire support increasingly effective.

Gallery

See also
 Fire support base
 Fire support team

References

Military terminology